Shawn Phillips (born February 3, 1943) is an American singer-songwriter and musician, primarily influential in the 1960s and 1970s.  His work is rooted in folk rock but straddles other genres, including jazz fusion and funk.  Phillips has recorded twenty-six albums and worked with musicians including Donovan, Paul Buckmaster, J. Peter Robinson, Eric Clapton, Steve Winwood, Bernie Taupin, Tim Hardin, Manos Hatzidakis and many others.

Rock impresario Bill Graham described the Texas-born musician as "the best kept secret in the music business". Phillips' AllMusic biography states: "His refusal to pigeonhole his music – which seamlessly melds folk, rock, jazz, funk, progressive, pop, electro, classical, and global folk traditions – to meet anyone else's expectations allowed him to retain his cult following without ever achieving the stardom that his talent seemed to merit."

Biography 

Phillips was born in Fort Worth, Texas, the son of James Atlee Phillips, writer of spy novels under the pseudonym of Philip Atlee, and nephew of CIA officer David Atlee Phillips. He grew up in various locations around the world, including Tahiti, and learned to play guitar as a child. He returned to live in Texas in the late 1950s, and, after a time in the U.S. Navy, moved to California.

He played in folk clubs in the early 1960s, alongside singer-songwriter Tim Hardin, comedian Lenny Bruce and others, and when in Saskatoon, Canada, met and taught guitar techniques to aspiring singer Joni Anderson (later Mitchell).  He recorded his first single, an adaptation of Bob Gibson's version of "Frankie and Johnnie" (credited as "The New Frankie & Johnnie Song"), in 1964. While travelling to India, he stopped in London and met record producer Denis Preston, who signed him to Columbia Records.  Phillips released two albums on the label, I'm a Loner (1965) and Shawn (1966), though neither was successful. During this period, Phillips also met Donovan. The pair ultimately collaborated on several songs, including "Season of the Witch", for which Phillips (though uncredited) composed the melody. Phillips also appeared on several of Donovan's albums, including Fairytale (on which Phillips is credited as writer of "Little Tin Soldier"), Sunshine Superman, and Mellow Yellow.  Through Donovan, he met The Beatles and contributed backing vocals on "Lovely Rita".

Phillips played the character Paul Taylor in the 1966 film "Run with the Wind", which he also wrote songs for.

In 1967, he left England after his work permit expired and after a period in Paris moved to Positano in Italy, while continuing to tour. He returned to England to write and perform, with The Djinn, the music for the controversial Jane Arden play Vagina Rex and the Gas Oven at the Arts Laboratory on Drury Lane in London in February 1969. Sponsored by Dick James, he also recorded material with Steve Winwood, Jim Capaldi and Chris Wood of Traffic. This was intended to become a trilogy of albums, combining songs together with instrumental pieces and verse readings. He was signed by A&M Records, but they decided to release only one album, comprising only Phillips' songs, which was released as Contribution (1970). The album, which ranged from folk rock to "introspective quasi-classical guitar pieces" was relatively successful, and Phillips released a string of further albums on A&M through the 1970s, starting with Second Contribution (1970), and Collaboration (1971).

The song with which he is most widely associated is "She Was Waiting For Her Mother At The Station In Torino And You Know I Love You Baby But It's Getting Too Heavy To Laugh", more commonly known as "Woman", from the Second Contribution album.

Phillips continued to tour and secured a standing ovation for his impromptu solo performance at the 1970 Isle of Wight Festival. He was also approached to be the lead in the Broadway production of Jesus Christ Superstar, and started rehearsing the show, but withdrew because of contractual disagreements with the show's producer, Robert Stigwood. He recorded successfully throughout the 1970s, with four of his albums – Faces (1972; No. 57), Bright White (1973; No. 72), Furthermore (1974; No. 50), and Do You Wonder (1975; No. 101) – reaching the Billboard pop LP chart in the U.S. In addition, the singles "Lost Horizon" (No. 63) and "We" (No. 92) appeared on the Billboard Hot 100 chart in 1973.

According to Bruce Eder at Allmusic, his 1970s recordings "established his reputation for boundless, nearly peerless creativity and virtuosity... [as a] 12-string guitarist combined with his four-octave vocal range.....Writers lavished praise on Phillips for his unusual lyrics, haunting melodies, daunting musicianship, and the ambition of his records. He was a complete enigma, American-born but raised internationally, with a foreigner's keen appreciation for all the music of his homeland and a seasoned traveler's love of world music, with none of the usual limits on his thinking about music."  Eder continued: "Phillips never achieved major stardom, despite his critical accolades. He never courted an obvious commercial sound, preferring to write songs that, as he put it, 'make you feel different from the way you felt before you started listening,' primarily love songs and sonic landscapes."

Later in the 1970s, Phillips began experimenting with jazz and funk music. using electronic keyboards.   He moved to RCA Records, and released Transcendence (1978), on which he played with Herbie Hancock and a symphony orchestra.  He also wrote music for movies. After moving from Italy back to Los Angeles, he recorded Beyond Here Be Dragons with musicians including Alphonso Johnson, Caleb Quaye, J. Peter Robinson, and Ralph Humphrey; the album was released in 1988.

Phillips retired from music in the mid-1990s and qualified as an emergency medical technician (EMT) and firefighter in Texas. He moved to near Port Elizabeth, South Africa in 2000 with his wife Juliette and worked as a paramedic with the National Sea Rescue Institute. His album No Category, containing a mix of new and unreleased music featuring his longtime collaborators Paul Buckmaster and Peter Robinson, was released in 2002. In 2007, his first live album, Living Contribution, was released, along with a live DVD of the same title. His early recordings were reissued on CD during the 1990s, together with several compilations of his work.

Since 2016, Phillips has resided in Louisville, Kentucky, with Juliette and their son, Liam. He now divides his time between writing, recording, touring, and his EMT work.

Of his EMT work, he says: “One of my EMT calls was an 89-year-old woman named Clara, who had fractured her pelvis from stepping out of bed too hard. I took a great deal of care to keep her from suffering before we transferred to Austin EMS.  I said to her, ‘We’re gonna give you over to these guys, but you’re in very good hands.’ She was very frightened. As I left, she grabbed me by the arm, looked me in the eyes, and said, ‘Thank you so much for taking care of me.’ And the music business just disappeared into the distance. I got a double standing ovation in front of 657,000 people at the Isle of Wight in the 1970s. You can imagine the rush. But that moment with Clara was much more powerful, because that work is immediate. It’s as real as you can get.” 

In an interview with Chicago music critic Scott Itter, Phillips was reminded that he had once been described as "the best kept secret in the music business" by the late rock impresario Bill Graham. Asked why he was still "a secret" to many people, Phillips replied:

Family and personal life
Before moving to Louisville, Kentucky, in 2016 with his wife, Juliette, and then-12-year-old son Liam, (named after his younger brother) Phillips lived in Italy and in South Africa.

Phillips's uncle, David Atlee Phillips, was a top CIA officer who was associated with the alleged assassin Lee Harvey Oswald.

Discography

Studio albums

 I'm a Loner (1965) [re-issued in Canada as Favourite Things]
 Shawn (1966) Columbia Records [re-issued in Canada as First Impressions]
 Contribution (1970)
 Second Contribution (1970) US No. 208, Canada No. 68
 Collaboration (1971)
 Faces (1972) US No. 57, Canada No. 38
 Bright White (1973) US No. 72, Canada No. 50
 Furthermore (1974), A&M Records US No. 50, Canada No. 56
 Do You Wonder (1974) US No. 101, Canada No. 42
 Rumplestiltskin's Resolve (1975) US No. 201
 Spaced (1977)
 Transcendence (1978) RCA Records
 Favourite Things (1987) Capitol Records
 Beyond Here Be Dragons (1983) Wounded Bird Records
 The Truth If It Kills (1994)
 No Category (2002) Universal Records / Fat Jack Records
 Reflections (2012)
 Perspective (2013)
 Infinity (2014)
 Continuance (2017)

Live albums 

 Living Contribution: Both Sides (2007) Sheer Sound
 At the BBC (2009) Hux Records
 Live in the seventies (2022) TLAK Records

Greatest hits 
 Best of Shawn Phillips (1990)
 The Best of Shawn Phillips: The A&M Years (1992)
 Another Contribution: Anthology (1995)
 Contribution/Second Contribution (2004)

Singles
 "A Christmas Song" (1970, A&M AMS-819)
 "We" (US #89, 1972, A&M 1402)
 "Lost Horizon" (US #63, 1973, A&M 1405)
 "Anello (Where Are You)" (1973, A&M 1435)
 "Bright White" (1973, A&M 1482) (#62 Canada)
 "Do You Wonder" (1974, A&M 1750) (#89 Canada)

Collaborations 
 1965 – Fairytale by Donovan: 12-string guitar on "Summer Day Reflection Song" and "Jersey Thursday", wrote "The Little Tin Soldier"
 1966 – Sunshine Superman by Donovan: sitar on 6 songs and co-wrote "Season Of The Witch" but was not credited
 1967 – Mellow Yellow by Donovan: sitar on "Sunny South Kensington"
 1969 – If Only For A Moment by Blossom Toes: guitar and sitar
 1970 – Into The Fire by Wynder K. Frog: co-wrote, played guitar and sang on "Eddie's Tune"
 1971 – Taupin by Bernie Taupin: co-wrote "To a Grandfather", "Today's Hero", "Ratcatcher" and "The Visitor"; played sitar, acoustic and electric 6 & 12 string guitars, koto and vocals
 1971 – Say No More by Linda Lewis: guitar
 1971 – Gilbert Montagné by Gilbert Montagné: guitar
 1973 – New York Rock by Michael Kamen: co-wrote "Hot as the Sun" and "Indian Summer"
 1980 – Cosmic Debris by Cosmic Debris: guitar, synthesizer and engineering
 1981 – Keys by Light: vocals on "It's For You Part I" and "It's For You Part II"

References

External links
Official website

Official ReverbNation channel

 Walking Through the Fields: The Shawn Phillips interview
 Shawn Phillips at discogs.com

1943 births
Living people
People from Fort Worth, Texas
American expatriates in South Africa
American rock songwriters
American rock guitarists
Fingerstyle guitarists
American male guitarists
American folk singers
American rock singers
American male singer-songwriters
Singer-songwriters from Texas
Winners of Yamaha Music Festival
Guitarists from Texas
20th-century American guitarists
20th-century American male musicians